Glenys Bakker (born August 27, 1962 in High River, Alberta) is a Canadian curler from Calgary, Alberta.

Bakker played second for Shannon Kleibrink's bronze medal winning team at the 2006 Winter Olympics.

Bakker played for Shannon Kleibrink for most of her curling career. At the 1993 Scott Tournament of Hearts, Bakker was Kleibrink's Alternate. She was Kleibrink's third at the 1997 Canadian Olympic Trials where the team lost to Sandra Schmirler in the final. In 2004, she was Kleibrink's second at the 2004 Scott Tournament of Hearts where they finished with a 6–5 record. Also as Kleibrink's second, the team won the 2005 Canada Cup of Curling and won the 2005 Canadian Olympic Curling Trials getting a berth at the 2006 Olympics.

At the Olympics, Bakker struggled for most of tournament, and was the 8th best second at the games out of ten second's. 

In 2006, Bakker left Kleibrink's team to focus more on her family.

References

External links
 
 World Curling Tour team profile

1962 births
Living people
Canadian people of Dutch descent
Canadian women curlers
Curlers at the 2006 Winter Olympics
Olympic bronze medalists for Canada
Olympic curlers of Canada
People from High River
Curlers from Calgary
Olympic medalists in curling
Medalists at the 2006 Winter Olympics
Canada Cup (curling) participants